The Sound of Fury may refer to:
 The Sound of Fury (album), the 1960 debut album by Billy Fury
 The Sound of Fury (film), a 1950 film starring Frank Lovejoy and Kathleen Ryan

See also
 Sound and Fury (disambiguation)
 The Sound and the Fury (disambiguation)